Apodoulou is the archaeological site of an ancient Minoan mansion or ceremonial building.

Geography
Apodoulou overlooks the Libyan Sea.

Altitude: 450m above sea level

Archaeology
Apodoulou was first excavated by Spyridon Marinatos in 1934.

The area was inhabited from Late Neolithic times to the Late Minoan period, and the building was in use in the Middle Minoan III period.  The site has yielded Linear A inscriptions on a basin and fragments of a stone cylindrical jar, as well as a small golden axe.

400m north of Apodoulou is a Late Minoan vaulted tomb.  Four sarcophagus were found here and are on exhibit at the Archaeological Museum of Rethymno.

References
 Swindale, Ian http://www.minoancrete.com/apodoulou.htm Retrieved 31 January 2006
 Municipality of Agia Galini http://www.interkriti.org/visits/agalini/apodoul.htm Retrieved 31 January 2006

External links
 http://www.minoancrete.com/apodoulou.htm

Minoan sites in Crete
Ancient houses in Greece
Populated places in Rethymno (regional unit)